Sushoma Sarkar is a Bangladeshi television and film actress who mainly appeared in TV Drama.

Career
Sushama Sarkar studied in Jahangirnagar University. She appeared in TV dramas like "Progga Paromita", "Bijli", "Dhonni Meye" etc. In 2016, she was cast in Indo-Bangladesh joint venture film Badsha – The Don which stars Jeet and Nusrat Faria.

Apart from films and television, she has acted in a number of stage dramas as well. She started with stage dramas 'Janame Janmantare' in 1999. In January 2018 it was confirmed that she'll return to stage dramas with 'Nityopuran' as Draupadi, which is written by Masum Reza. The role was earlier played by seniors like Banya Mirza and Naznin Hasan Chumki.

Television
Janame Janmantare
Shada Megher Brishti
Birosher Kabbo
Nitto Puran
Progga Paromita
Bijli
Dhonni Meye
Sonar Suto
Juboraj
Dhaka Jadur Shohor
Nondini
Nulok
Mone Mone
The Village Engineer
Bhalobashar Chotushkun

Filmography
 Koti Takar Kabin (2006)
 The Last Thakur (2008)
 Dub Satar (2010
 Karigor (2012)
 Olpo Olpo Premer Golpo (2014)
 Chuye Dile Mon (2015)
 Bhubon Majhi (2015)
 Badsha - The Don (2016)
 Dhat Teri Ki (2017)
 Dahan (2018)
 Shapludu (2019)
 Nabab LLB (2020)
 The Grave (2020)

Web series
Ashare Golpo, Bioscope Original

References

Living people
Bangladeshi actresses
Bangladeshi film actresses
Bangladeshi television actresses
Bangladeshi Hindus
Actresses in Bengali cinema
Bangladeshi expatriate actresses in India
Jahangirnagar University alumni
Year of birth missing (living people)
21st-century Bangladeshi actresses